2016–17 Eerste Klasse was a Dutch association football season of the Eerste Klasse.

Saturday champions were:
Amsterdamsche Football Club
FC 's-Gravenzande
VV Rijsoord
VV Berkum
HZVV

Sunday champions were:
VPV Purmersteijn
RKSV Leonidas
VV Baronie
SV Meerssen
BVC '12
Achilles 1894

Eerste Klasse seasons
Eerste Klasse